Anloga is a town in Keta District of the Volta Region in southeast Ghana. It lies east of the Volta River and just south of the Keta Lagoon. Anloga is the forty-seventh most populous town in Ghana, in terms of population, with a population of 35,933 people.

History
Anloga became the traditional and ritual capital of the Anlo Ewe in the seventeenth century after they migrated to the Keta Lagoon area from Notsie in Togo.

Following the Anlo-Danish War, the Danes built Fort Prinzenstein at Keta in 1784. However their efforts to exert any power beyond the range of the guns located in the fort proved to be ineffective. In June 1790 a Danish official was killed in Keta. Lacking any effective military forces the Danes hired the Anloga to punish the Keta. Initially the Anloga and Keta agreed to stage a battle after which the Anloga would burn a few Keta houses and then share the money provided by the Danes. But the mock fight somehow turned into a real battle, leaving a legacy of enmity between Anloga and Keta. Keta then moved across the lagoon to build the Somey State with Agbozume as their traditional capital. This substantially weakened the Anlo people. In 1850 Fort Prinzenstein was sold to the British, however it took them another twenty five years to integrate towns like Anloga into their colony which they called the Gold Coast colony

Etymology

Anlo:ga (Ewe language) - Me: nlo: - I have shrunk/ my skin has shrunk/shriveled.
These words were uttered by Torgbui Wenya , the founder of Anlo State to convey his reluctance to move farther after he left his kinsmen in Wheta to move to the seashore. 
The suffix ‘gã' denotes big in Ewe, so 'Anloga' (Ewe: Aŋlɔgã) literally means Big Anlo in reference to it being the traditional capital.

Education
 Keta Senior High Technical School
 Anlo Secondary School
 Anlo Technical Institute
Zion Senior High School
Keta Business College

Notes

 6. Felix Kuadugah- contributor. Etymology of Anloga

External links
"Anloga Map — Satellite Images of Anloga" Maplandia World Gazetteer

Populated places in the Volta Region